Karen Aghasi Jalavyan (born 25 January 1971), also known by his nom de guerre Kyokh, is an Armenian military officer, colonel of the Artsakh Defence Army, commander of the Yeghnikner military unit and recipient of the award Hero of Artsakh.

Awards

During the Second Nagorno-Karabakh War, Jalavyan commanded the Yeghnikner military unit, which was stationed in the north of the Republic of Artsakh near the village of Tonashen. On 2 October 2020, Jalavyan received the highest title of Artsakh, Hero of Artsakh, from the president of the republic Arayik Harutyunyan. According to Harutyunyan, Jalavyan's detachment managed to "occupy several strategic heights and inflict heavy casualties on the Azerbaijani forces".

References

1971 births
Living people
Heroes of Artsakh
Armenian colonels
Artsakh military personnel